The men's 48 kg powerlifting event at the 2012 Summer Paralympics was contested on 30 August at ExCeL London.

Records 
Prior to the competition, the existing world and Paralympic records were as follows.

The world record holder, Yakubu Adesokan of Nigeria, broke both of these records during the competition.

Results

References 

 

Men's 048 kg